Denis Maccan (born 19 May 1984) is an Italian footballer who plays as a forward, currently for Portogruaro.

Career statistics 

Serie B : 13 caps, 1 goal

Serie C1 : 62 caps, 1 goal

Serie C2 : 68 caps, 26 goals

Total : 143 caps, 28 goals

References

External links
Career profile (from aic.it)

Living people
1984 births
Italian footballers
A.S.D. Sangiovannese 1927 players
S.S. Arezzo players
Brescia Calcio players
F.C. Lumezzane V.G.Z. A.S.D. players
Venezia F.C. players
A.C. Perugia Calcio players
S.S. Fidelis Andria 1928 players
Serie B players
Association football forwards